Weapons of Death (also known as Naples Shoots) is a poliziottesco film directed by Mario Caiano in 1977. It is spin-off from the Commissioner Betti Trilogy as the character of Gennarino (still played by Massimo Deda) returns from the film Violent Naples.

Cast
Leonard Mann as Commissioner  Belli
Henry Silva as Santoro
Jeff Blynn as Guidi
Evelyne Stewart as Lucia Parisi
 Massimo Deda as Gennarino
Adolfo Lastretti as Pedophile
Kirsten Gille as Taxi patron
Mario Deda as Nardi, Belli's assistant
Enrico Maisto as Don Licata
Tommaso Palladino as Don Calise 
Tino Bianchi as  Don Alfredo
Mario Erpichini as Chief of Police
Maurizio Gueli as Serrao
Massimo Vanni as Rosati 
Maurizio Mattioli as Special Agent

Release
Weapons of Death was released in Italy on February 22, 1977 through the distributor Fida Cinematografica. It grossed a total of 1,049,324,370 Italian lira on its release.

Notes

References

External links

1977 films
1970s Italian-language films
1977 crime films
Poliziotteschi films
Films about the Camorra
Films scored by Francesco De Masi
Films set in Naples
Unofficial sequel films
1970s Italian films